David Malone may refer to:

David Malone (independent filmmaker) (born 1962), British documentary filmmaker
David Malone (sport shooter) (born 1964), Irish sports shooter
David Malone (swimmer) (born 1977), Irish paralympian
David M. Malone (born 1954), Canadian scholar-diplomat
Dave Malone (born 1952), American guitarist/vocalist of The Radiators